Kay Schrøder (1 July 1877 – 25 April 1949) was a Danish fencer and architect. He competed in three fencing events at the 1920 Summer Olympics. He also competed in the architecture event in the art competition at the 1924 Summer Olympics.

References

1877 births
1949 deaths
Danish male fencers
Olympic fencers of Denmark
Fencers at the 1920 Summer Olympics
Sportspeople from Copenhagen
19th-century Danish architects
20th-century Danish architects
Olympic competitors in art competitions